Eastern Air Command may refer to :
 Eastern Air Command (India)
 RCAF Eastern Air Command, a home defence command of Canada during the Second World War
 Major subordinate command of the Allied air forces under Air Command South-East Asia, during 1944–45